Samuel Jesse Brown (October 3, 1917 – August 23, 1990) was a fighter pilot and a major in the United States Air Forces during World War II.

307th Fighter Squadron
Brown commanded the 307th Fighter Squadron of the 31st Fighter Group between May and September 1944.

He shot down 15.5 aircraft between April 17 and July 26, 1944. 

He received the Distinguished Service for attacking a formation of 50 German fighters near Vienna, Austria that were preparing to attack a formation of 15th Air Force bombers near Vienna. During the subsequent aerial combat that followed, Brown shot down four of the planes and damaged two others.

See also
Harrison Thyng

References

External links

1917 births
1990 deaths
United States Army Air Forces officers
United States Army Air Forces pilots of World War II